Thorsten Bolzek (born 7 July 1968) is a retired German football forward.

Career

Statistics

References

External links
 

1968 births
Living people
Footballers from Berlin
German footballers
Bundesliga players
2. Bundesliga players
VfL Bochum players
SC Fortuna Köln players
Füchse Berlin Reinickendorf players
Association football forwards